Pontibacter ramchanderi  is a Gram-negative, rod-shaped and motile bacterium from the genus of Pontibacter which has been isolated from a pond which was contaminated with hexachlorocyclohexane in Lucknow in India.

References

External links
Type strain of Pontibacter ramchanderi at BacDive -  the Bacterial Diversity Metadatabase

Cytophagia
Bacteria described in 2013